Thomas Holt may refer to:
Thomas Holt (architect) (1578?–1624), English architect
Thomas Holt (MP for Canterbury) , England, in 1386
Thomas Holt (Serjeant-at-Law) (1616–1686), English lawyer and politician; Member of Parliament for Abingdon
Thomas Holt (Australian politician) (1811–1888), wool merchant, financier and politician
Thomas Michael Holt (1831–1896), Governor of North Carolina, 1891–1893
Thomas Holt (American architect) (1835–1889)
Tom Holt (swimmer) (1923–2004), British swimmer
Thomas C. Holt (born 1942), American writer and historian
Tom Holt (born 1961), author of humorous fantasies and historical fiction

See also

Thomas Holte (1571–1654), English landowner
Thomas Holte (MP) (died 1546), Member of the Parliament of England for Warwick in 1529
Tom Holte, a fictional character from Sandino (film)
Holte (surname)
Holt (surname)
Holt (disambiguation)